The 2001 Asian PGA Tour, titled as the 2001 Davidoff Tour for sponsorship reasons, was the seventh season of the Asian PGA Tour, the main men's professional golf tour in Asia excluding Japan.

Schedule
The following table lists official events during the 2001 season.

Order of Merit
The Order of Merit was based on prize money won during the season, calculated in U.S. dollars.

Notes

References

Asian PGA Tour
Asian Tour